is a passenger railway station in the city of Kashiwa, Chiba, Japan, operated by the private railway operator Tōbu Railway. The station is numbered "TD-25".

Lines

Station layout
Shin-Kashiwa Station has one elevated island platform serving two tracks, with the station building underneath.

Platforms

History
Shin-Kashiwa Station opened on 21 July 1983. From 17 March 2012, station numbering was introduced on all Tobu lines, with Shin-Kashiwa Station becoming "TD-25".

Passenger statistics
In fiscal 2019, the station was used by an average of 20,417 passengers daily.

Surrounding area
Hitachi Kashiwa Soccer Stadium

References

External links

 Tobu Railway Station information 

Railway stations in Chiba Prefecture
Railway stations in Japan opened in 1983
Tobu Noda Line
Stations of Tobu Railway
Kashiwa